The 2020–21 Mercyhurst Lakers men's ice hockey season was the 34th season of play for the program, the 22nd at the Division I level, and the 18th season in the Atlantic Hockey conference. The Lakers represented Mercyhurst University and were coached by Rick Gotkin, in his 33rd season.

The start of the college hockey season was delayed due to the ongoing coronavirus pandemic. As a result, Mercyhurst's first scheduled game was in mid-November as opposed to early-October, which was the norm.

Season
As a result of the ongoing COVID-19 pandemic the entire college ice hockey season was delayed. Because the NCAA had previously announced that all winter sports athletes would retain whatever eligibility they possessed through at least the following year, none of Mercyhurst's players would lose a season of play. However, the NCAA also approved a change in its transfer regulations that would allow players to transfer and play immediately rather than having to sit out a season, as the rules previously required.

Mercyhurst managed to recover after the program's worst season, posting a middling record amidst an ever-changing schedule. Despite playing 14 fewer games, the Lakers won three more games than they had the year before. including three over ranked opponents.

Ashton Stockie and Carver Watson sat out the season.

Departures

Recruiting

Roster
As of December 31, 2020.

Standings

Schedule and results

|-
!colspan=12 style=";" | Regular Season

|-
!colspan=12 style=";" |

Scoring statistics

Goaltending statistics

Rankings

USCHO did not release a poll in week 20.

Awards and honors

References

Mercyhurst Lakers men's ice hockey seasons
Mercyhurst Lakers
Mercyhurst Lakers
Mercyhurst Lakers
2021 in sports in Pennsylvania
2020 in sports in Pennsylvania